Belgium Rugby League Association was formed in 2009 to govern the Belgium national rugby league team, which was formed after the success of the 2008 World Cup.

References

External links

Rugby league in Belgium
Sports governing bodies in Belgium
Rugby league governing bodies in Europe
Sports organizations established in 2009